The Yamauchi clan (山内氏) were a family of rulers over what was then the Tosa Province which spanned the southern half of Shikoku island.

The province was given to the family in 1600 after Yamauchi Kazutoyo led troops under Tokugawa Ieyasu at the Battle of Sekigahara. The family stayed loyal to the Tokugawa dynasty until shortly before its overthrow in 1868. The head of the family at that time Yamauchi Toyoshige became prince of the newly formed Kōchi Prefecture under Imperial rule.

Notable members 

 Yamauchi Kazutoyo
 Yamauchi Chiyo
 Yamauchi Toyoshige

References

Japanese clans
Fujiwara clan